Eguerreiro Vata Garcia Edemar  (born 13 June 1986), simply known as Edemar Garcia, is an Australian footballer with Angolan descent, who played as a midfielder for Arema Cronous in Indonesia Super League.

He is the son of Angolan international player and former player Gelora Dewata namely Vata Matanu Garcia.

References

1986 births
Living people
People from Cunene Province
Angolan footballers
Association football midfielders
Liga 1 (Indonesia) players
Arema F.C. players
Angolan expatriate footballers
Expatriate footballers in Indonesia